Oecusse Airport , officially Oecusse Route of the Sandalwood International Airport, and formerly Palaban Airport, is an international airport serving Pante Macassar, the capital city of the Oecusse Special Administrative Region of East Timor.

Location
Immediately to the north of the airport is the Savu Sea; the airport's runway (09/27) is oriented east-west.

History
In 1967, Transportes Aéreos de Timor (TAT), the national airline of the then Portuguese Timor, was operating flights between Baucau and Oecusse, with two de Havilland Doves. In 1974 and 1975, TAT was flying scheduled domestic services from Dili to Oecusse.

As of the mid 1990s, an Indonesian State-owned airline, Merpati Nusantara Airlines, was flying into Oecusse.

Immediately prior to its redevelopment in the 2010s, the airport site was an essentially abandoned and nonfunctional airfield with an unpaved runway. It had no terminal, control tower or any other type of physical structure. That year, the government of East Timor planned to carry out a provisional rehabilitation of the airfield site, including the erection of a wire perimeter fence, a clean up and repair of the runway and aviation equipment, and the installation of a provisional control tower and allied facilities.

A report published in 2014 by the authority overseeing the development of a special economic zone in Oecusse recommended the complete overhaul of the airfield. The contractor for the development project was giant Indonesian state-owned enterprise , and ISQ (Portugal) acted as a project consultant.

The work on the project included the construction or installation of landside and airside facilities such as an air traffic control (ATC) tower, a terminal building, quarantine facilities, a fuel depot, distance measuring equipment (DME), a VHF omnidirectional range (VOR) system, a taxiway and apron, airfield lighting (AFL), and other airport equipment. Additionally, the runway was widened and lengthened, the airport grounds were expanded to facilitate commercial operations, and the radar, navigation and safety systems were upgraded to international airport safety standards. More than 500 Indonesian and East Timorese workers were engaged on the project; most of the construction materials were brought in from Indonesia.

On 18 June 2019, the redeveloped airport was inaugurated by East Timor President Francisco Guterres. Also present at the inauguration ceremony were the president of the Oecusse Special Administrative Region, Mari Alkatiri; the governor of the Indonesian province of Nusa Tenggara Timur, Viktor Laiskodat; and others.

One of the airport's new jet bridges was used on that occasion, but neither has been used ever since. The airport is regarded by critics of the Oecusse-Ambeno Special Administrative Region (RAEOA) project as being the most prominent negative symbol of investments in the region, which they consider to be excessive, at least for the time being.

Facilities
When in full operation, it is capable of processing more than 500 passengers per hour, and one million passengers per year, between departures and arrivals. It also has automatic emergency power generation systems, modern firefighting equipment and ground support equipment for aircraft support, automatic meteorological information system and a control tower with modern and complete communication systems.

The airport complies with the applicable ICAO and IATA international standards in terms of safety, security and comfort of usage. It was designed to handle unrestricted operation of Airbus A320 or Boeing 737-800 aircraft, day and night. The airport also has facilities for the processing of cargo and live animals, including quarantine services.

Airlines and destinations

Passenger

Gallery

See also
 List of airports in East Timor
 Transport in East Timor

References

Further reading

External links 

 Special Economic Zones for Social Market Economy website 

Airports in East Timor
Oecusse